The list of ship launches in 1773 includes a chronological list of some ships launched in 1773.


References

1773
Ship launches